Bovo is a surname. Notable people with the surname include:

Alessandro Bovo (born 1969), Italian water polo player
Andrea Bovo (born 1986), Italian footballer
Brunella Bovo (1932–2017), Italian actress
Cesare Bovo (born 1983), Italian footballer
Esteban Bovo (born 1962), American politician